Joeri Poelmans (born 8 September 1995) is a Belgian footballer who plays as a left back for Lierse Kempenzonen.

Club career
On 22 April 2021, he signed a one-year contract with Lierse Kempenzonen.

References

External links

1995 births
Living people
People from Sint-Truiden
Belgian footballers
Association football fullbacks
Challenger Pro League players
Lierse S.K. players
Eerste Divisie players
Helmond Sport players
Liga II players
FC Petrolul Ploiești players
Lierse Kempenzonen players
Belgian expatriate footballers
Belgian expatriate sportspeople in the Netherlands
Expatriate footballers in the Netherlands
Belgian expatriate sportspeople in Romania
Expatriate footballers in Romania
Footballers from Limburg (Belgium)